George Pepper may refer to:

 George Pepper (film producer) (1913–1969), American film producer, Hollywood organizer, child violin prodigy
 George W. Pepper (1867–1961), American lawyer, law professor, and Republican politician from Pennsylvania
 George H. Pepper (1873–1924), American ethnologist and archaeologist
 George Pepper (artist) (1903–1962), Canadian artist